Righton is a surname. Notable people with the surname include:

Alan Righton (1905–1982), Australian rugby league footballer
Caroline Righton (born 1958), English television presenter and author
Edward Righton (actor) (1838–1899), English actor
Edward Righton junior (1912–1986), English first-class cricketer
Edward Righton senior (1884–1964), English first-class cricketer
James Righton (born 1983), English musician
Len Righton (1898–1972), New Zealand rugby union player
Peter Righton (1926–2007), child protection expert, social care worker, convicted child molester
Sybilla Righton Masters (1676–1720), American inventor

See also
Ride On (disambiguation)
Right On (disambiguation)
Write On (disambiguation)
Ryton (disambiguation)